Jason John may refer to:

 Jason Herbert (born 1967), also known as Jason John, British musician, member of Big Fun
 Jason John (athlete) (born 1971), British sprinter